Association Sportive Jeunes Tahitienes, is a football club from Papeete, Tahiti. It's one of the oldest football clubs in French Polynesia, been founded on 1923. It currently competes at Tahiti Ligue 1, after being promoted from Tahiti Ligue 2 in the 2017–18 season.

Current squad
Squad for the 2019-20 Tahiti Ligue 1:

Staff

Achievements
Tahiti Ligue 1
Champions (3): 1954, 1961, 1987.

Tahiti Cup
Champions (2): 1951, 1971, 1982, 1987, 1989.

Continental Record

Last seasons

References

External links
Official website

Football clubs in Tahiti
Football clubs in French Polynesia
Association football clubs established in 1923
1923 establishments in French Polynesia